The 1959 GP Ouest-France was the 23rd edition of the GP Ouest-France cycle race and was held on 1 September 1959. The race started and finished in Plouay. The race was won by Emmanuel Crenn.

General classification

References

1959
1959 in road cycling
1959 in French sport
September 1959 sports events in Europe